James Hutchinson Smylie (October 20, 1925 – January 5, 2019) was Professor of Church History at Union Theological Seminary & Presbyterian School of Christian Education and author of books on American church history and presbyterianism.

Career
Smylie was born in Huntington, West Virginia, where his father was a pastor. He was educated at Washington University in St. Louis, where he graduated BA in 1946, and at Princeton Theological Seminary, where he was awarded his BD in 1949 and master's degree in 1950. He served as a Presbyterian minister in St. Louis, 1950–1952, and married Elizabeth Roblee at that time. From 1952 until 1962 he taught at Princeton Theological Seminary, initially while working on his PhD there, which was completed in 1958. He began his work at Union Theological Seminary in Virginia (now Union/PSCE) in 1962, becoming full professor in 1968, and remained there until retiring in 1996.

His doctoral dissertation was on the subject of American Clergymen and the Constitution of the United States of America, 1780-1796 and his interests broadened from that topic to include church-state relations, human rights, and the impact of Presbyterian theology on American political thought.

Works
For 28 years Smylie edited the Journal of Presbyterian History on behalf of the Presbyterian Historical Society, Philadelphia. Additionally he wrote the following books.

References

 The Presbyterian Outlook, August 2009

1925 births
2019 deaths
20th-century American historians
American male non-fiction writers
20th-century Presbyterians
21st-century American historians
21st-century American male writers
21st-century Presbyterians
American historians of religion
Academic journal editors
American Presbyterians
Historians from West Virginia
Historians of Christianity
Presbyterians from West Virginia
Princeton Theological Seminary alumni
Princeton Theological Seminary faculty
Washington University in St. Louis alumni
Writers from Huntington, West Virginia
20th-century American male writers